Simon Ings is an English novelist and science writer living in London. He was born in July 1965 in Horndean and educated at Churcher's College, Petersfield and at King's College London and Birkbeck College, London.

Ings has written a number of novels, short prose and articles for national newspapers.  He was culture editor at New Scientist for a while and as of 2021 continues to write for the magazine on cultural subjects. His non-fiction book The Eye: A Natural History delved into the science of vision exploring the chemistry, physics and biology of the eye.

Ings has collaborated with M. John Harrison on short fiction including "The Dead" (1992) and "The Rio Brain". The latter was published as a separate booklet by Night Shade Books and was available only with the limited edition of Harrison's collection Things That Never Happen. He has also collaborated on short fiction with Charles Stross.

Bibliography

Novels
Hot Head, Grafton Books, 1992, 
City of the Iron Fish, Collins, 1994, 
Hotwire, Collins, 1995, 
Headlong, HarperCollins, 1999, 
Painkillers, Bloomsbury, 2000, 
The Weight of Numbers, Atlantic Books, 2006, 
Dead Water, Corvus Books/Atlantic Books, 2010, 
Wolves, Gollancz, 2014, 
The Smoke, Orion, 2018,

Non-fiction
The Eye: A Natural History, Bloomsbury, 2007, 
A Natural History of Seeing, W. W. Norton, 2008, 
Stalin and the Scientists: A History of Triumph and Tragedy 1905–1953, Faber & Faber, 2016,

Selected short fiction
"The Braining of Mother Lamprey" (1990)
"The Black Lotus" (1993)
"Grand Prix" (1993)
"Volatile" (1995)
"Open Veins" (1997)
"Myxamatosis" (2000)
"Ménage" (2001)
"Russian Vine" (2001)
"Myxomatosis" (2001)
"Menage" (2001)
"The Convert" (2002)
"Elephant" (2003)
"The Wedding Party" (2007)
"Zoology" (2009)

References

External links
 Simon Ings's own Web site
 Calgary Herald Interview

 Story Behind Wolves – Online by Simon Ings

1965 births
Living people
People educated at Churcher's College
Alumni of King's College London
Alumni of Birkbeck, University of London
People from Horndean
English science fiction writers
English male novelists
English male non-fiction writers
Weird fiction writers